Schwenke is a surname of German origin, where the following persons are known for:
 Brian Schwenke (born 1991), U.S. American football player
  (born 1934), German photographer and delegate
  (1563–1610), German sculptor from Pirna, Saxony
 Mignon Schwenke (born 1954), German state politician (The Left)
 Nelson Schwenke (1957–2012), Chilean musician
  (1853–1921), librarian and book scientist
  (1873–1944), German constructing engineer and automotive pioneer
  (born 1939), German politician (CDU)
  (born 1960), German politician (CDU), state delegate in Saxony-Anhalt
 Winfried Schwenke (born 1935), German general in the Bundeswehr
 Wolfgang Schwenke (1921–2006), German zoologist, entomologist and forest scientist
 Wolfgang Schwenke (handballer) (born 1968), German handball player and trainer

Schwenke denotes 
 Schwenke, Halver, a quarter of the Westphalian town Halver
 Schwennigke, also Schwenke, a river in Saxony, Germany

See also
 Schwenck (born 1979), Brazilian footballer
 
 Schwenk, a family name (including a list of persons with the name)